The 1933 Colorado Silver and Gold football team was an American football team that represented the University of Colorado as a member of the Rocky Mountain Conference (RMC) during the 1933 college football season. Led by second-year head coach Head coach Bill Saunders, Colorado compiled an overall record of 7–2 with an mark of 5–2 in conference play, placing fourth in the RMC.

Schedule

References

Colorado
Colorado Buffaloes football seasons
Colorado Silver and Gold football